Burna may refer to:

People
Burnaburiash I, (c. 1500 BC), Babylonian king
Burna-Buriash II (reigned 1359–1333 BC), Babylonian King
Burna Boy (born 1990), Nigerian musician
Jay Burna (born 1989), American hip hop recording artist
L-Burna (Layzie Bone, born 1974), American rapper
Mama Burna, mother and manager of Burna Boy
Tel Burna, an archaeological site in Israel

Places
Burna, Kentucky, an American community
Burnas Lagoon, a marine lagoon in Ukraine